Gatab-e Jonubi Rural District is a rural district (dehestan) in Gatab District, Babol County, Mazandaran Province, Iran. At the 2006 census, its population was 14,743, in 3,532 families. The rural district has 19 villages.

References 

Rural Districts of Mazandaran Province
Babol County